Half a Man is a 1925 American silent comedy film starring Stan Laurel.

Cast
 Stan Laurel as Winchell McSweeney
 Tui Bow as Shipwrecked woman (uncredited)
 Julie Leonard as Shipwrecked woman (uncredited)
 Blanche Payson as Shipwrecked woman (uncredited)
 Murray Rock as Boat crew (uncredited)

See also
 List of American films of 1925

References

External links

Half a Man at SilentEra

1925 films
1925 short films
American silent short films
Silent American comedy films
American black-and-white films
1925 comedy films
Films directed by Harry Sweet
Films directed by Joe Rock
American comedy short films
1920s American films